Chastellain is a surname. Notable people with the surname include:

Georges Chastellain (1415–1475), Burgundian chronicler
Pierre Chastellain (1606–1684), Jesuit missionary